Nodira Gulova (born 22 June 1988) is an Uzbekistani judoka.

She is the bronze medallist of the 2016 Judo Grand Prix Tashkent in the -48 kg category.

References

External links
 

1988 births
Living people
Uzbekistani female judoka
20th-century Uzbekistani women
21st-century Uzbekistani women
Asian Games medalists in sambo
Sambo practitioners at the 2018 Asian Games
Medalists at the 2018 Asian Games
Asian Games bronze medalists for Uzbekistan